{{DISPLAYTITLE:C10H10O4}}
The molecular formula C10H10O4 (molar mass: 194.18 g/mol, exact mass : 194.057909 u) may refer to:
 Dimethyl phthalate
 Dimethyl terephthalate
 Ferulic acid
 6-Hydroxymellein
 Isoferulic acid
 Methyl caffeate